Thrapston Station Quarry is a  geological Site of Special Scientific Interest south of Thrapston in Northamptonshire. It is a Geological Conservation Review site. It was formerly called the Thrapston Midland Railway Station Quarry.

This site has the most important remaining Middle Jurassic Cornbrash geological section in the Midlands. It is the type site for the Bathonian Blisworth Clay section, dating to 168 to 166 million years ago, and it has the only complete exposure of this section. Diagnostic ammonites have helped to date the site, which has also yielded important Bryozoan fossils.

The site is on private land with no public access.

References

Sites of Special Scientific Interest in Northamptonshire
Geological Conservation Review sites
Thrapston